Griffith v. Kentucky, 479 U.S. 314 (1987), is a case decided by the United States Supreme Court.

Background
Randall Lamont Griffith, who is African American, was indicted for first-degree robbery in 1982 at the Circuit Court of Jefferson County, Kentucky.  This Supreme Court decision concerned the retrospective application of judge-made rules. Specifically, the Court had to decide whether a prosecutor's use of peremptory challenges to exclude black jurors, combined with his call to the jury clerk, violated the black petitioner's right to an impartial jury. The Court was called upon to decide whether its previous decision in Batson v. Kentucky was applicable to litigation that was not yet final or that was pending on direct review (that is, on direct appeal rather than a collateral attack such as by petition for a writ of habeas corpus) when Batson was decided. Both Griffith and Batson concern trials in the same courthouse.

Question
Could retroactive Supreme Court decisions be applied selectively to cases pending direct review or not yet final?

Holding
The Court held that after a new rule had been decided in a particular case, "the integrity of judicial review requires that we apply that rule to all similar cases pending on direct review." The Court reasoned that selective application of new rules violated the principle of treating similarly situated defendants on an equal basis. The Court also refused to make an exception to the rule of retroactivity in cases where there was a "clean break" with past precedent.

See also
 List of United States Supreme Court cases
 Lists of United States Supreme Court cases by volume
 List of United States Supreme Court cases, volume 479
 List of United States Supreme Court cases by the Rehnquist Court

External links

United States Supreme Court cases
United States Supreme Court cases of the Rehnquist Court
Batson challenge case law
1987 in United States case law
Jefferson County, Kentucky
History of Louisville, Kentucky